The Bonyic Dam is a gravity dam on the Bonyic River, a tributary of the Teribe River about  southwest of Changuinola in the Bocas del Toro province of northwestern Panama. The builder and operator is Hidroécología Teribe (HET) S.A., a private Panamanian company whose majority stockholder is Empresas Públicas de Medellín (EPM), a public utility company owned by the municipal government of Medellín, Colombia. The dam construction was subject to controversies that have resulted in the removal of its funding by the Inter-American Development Bank. The Bonyic dam would obstruct access for migrating fish to La Amistad International Park. Members of the local indigenous people, the Naso, have periodically blockaded the single road to delay construction for a cumulative total of four years.

See also

 List of power stations in Panama

Citations

Dams in Panama
Hydroelectric power stations in Panama
Indigenous rights protests
Run-of-the-river power stations
Roller-compacted concrete dams